Norling is a Swedish surname. Notable people with the surname include:

Anders Norling (born 1956), Swedish Olympic swimmer
Axel Norling (1884–1964), Swedish gymnast, diver, and tug of war competitor 
Bengt Norling (1925–2002), Swedish politician 
Clive Norling, Welsh international rugby union referee
Daniel Norling (1888–1958), Swedish gymnast and equestrian, brother of Axel 
Figge Norling (born 1965), Swedish actor and theatre director
Katrin Norling (born 1979), Swedish Olympic equestrian
Lars-Olof Norling (born 1935), Swedish Olympic boxer
Lisa Norling, American historian
Rikard Norling (born 1971), Swedish football manager 
Tova Magnusson-Norling (born 1968), Swedish film and television actress, comedian, and film director; former wife of Figge Norling

See also
Norling Drayang, Bhutanese music and film production company

Swedish-language surnames